Vahid Namdari (born 26 June 2000) is an Iranian football player who plays as midfielder for the Persian Gulf Pro League club Sanat Naft Abadan.

Honours

Club
Foolad
Hazfi Cup: 2020–21 
Iranian Super Cup: 2021

International
Iran U16
 AFC U-16 Championship runner-up: 2016

References

External Links

2000 births
Living people
Iranian footballers
Persian Gulf Pro League players
Esteghlal Khuzestan players
Association football midfielders
Iran youth international footballers
People from Ahvaz
Sportspeople from Khuzestan province